Nernst is a lunar impact crater that lies on the far side of the Moon, just beyond the northwestern limb. It lies across the northern part of the larger walled plain Lorentz, and intrudes slightly into the northwestern rim of the crater Röntgen.

The rim of Nernst is relatively well-defined, although several smaller impacts lies across the edge. The satellite crater Nernst T has broken through the western rim edge. Smaller craters also lie along the rim to the southwest and south-southeast. Around the remainder of the inner wall is some slumping and a few terrace-like features.

The interior of Nernst is relatively level, with a central peak formation offset slightly to the south of the midpoint. A pair of small craters lies on the interior floor along the western and southern inner edges. Parts of the remaining floor are marked by a series of rilles. In the southern half these rilles form grooves running generally from east to west.

Satellite craters
By convention these features are identified on lunar maps by placing the letter on the side of the crater midpoint that is closest to Nernst.

References

 
 
 
 
 
 
 
 
 
 
 
 

Walther Nernst
Impact craters on the Moon